Sir Hugh Ridley Sykes  (born 12 September 1932) is an English industrialist and investor, noted for championing regeneration in and around Sheffield.

Early life
Sir Hugh was born in Bristol. He was educated at Bristol Grammar School and Clare College, Cambridge, where he graduated in Law.

Career
His public work in South Yorkshire includes:

2004-08 Chairman of Renaissance South Yorkshire;
2000-07 Deputy Chairman (later Chairman) of Sheffield One;
1988-97 Chairman of Sheffield Development Corporation.

Sir Hugh is also Chairman of the Sheffield Galleries and Museums Trust, the first museum trust in the country.

His work has been recognised by a series of awards: Honorary Fellow, Sheffield Hallam University, 1991; Deputy Lieutenant for South Yorkshire, 1995; Honorary Doctorate in Laws, University of Sheffield, 1996 and Knight Bachelor in Her Majesty’s Birthday Honours, 1997.

Personal life
He is married to Lady (Ruby) Sykes. For some years they lived at Hallfield House, but they now live at Brookfield Manor, Hathersage which they operate as a wedding venue.

References

People educated at Bristol Grammar School
Living people
Knights Bachelor
Businesspeople awarded knighthoods
Businesspeople from Sheffield
People from Hathersage
1932 births